Sarasin is a surname, originating (unrelatedly) in Switzerland and Thailand.

 Arsa Sarasin (born 1936), Thai diplomat and businessman
 Edouard Sarasin (1843–1917), Swiss scientist
 Fritz Sarasin (1859–1942), full name Karl Friedrich Sarasin, Swiss naturalist
 Jakob Sarasin (1742–1802), Swiss manufacturer and writer in the Age of Enlightenment
 Jean François Sarrazin (c. 1611–1654), or Sarasin, French author
 Kanit Sarasin (born 1964), Thai actor
 Pao Sarasin (1929–2013), Thai politician and policeman
 Paul Sarasin (1856–1929), full name Paul Benedict Sarasin, a Swiss naturalist
 Pong Sarasin (born 1927), Thai businessman and politician 
 Pote Sarasin (1905–2000), Thai diplomat and politician
 Ronald A. Sarasin (born 1934), U.S. Representative from Connecticut
 Thian-hee Sarasin (1848–1925), Thai physician

See also 
 Sarasin family
 Sarasin's goby
 for species named for the Sarasins
 J. Safra Sarasin, a Swiss private bank